Tavros, officially Tavros–Eleftherios Venizelos is a station on Line 1 of the Athens Metro, 6.171 km from the line's southern terminus at Piraeus. It is located in the municipality of Tavros, near the boundary with Kallithea. The station is also known as Tavros-Eleftherios Venizelou, after the former Prime Minister Eleftherios Venizelos.

History
The first proposals for a station were made in 1925, when engineer Alexander Verdelis demarcated the Harokopou station at almost the same location as part of his proposal to build a wider subway network for the capital. Construction of the plant began in 1988, and opened on 6 February 1989 at a cost of 200 million drachmas. The station was renovated in 2004 in the run-up to the Summer Olympics that year.

Facilities
It has a central island platform serving two tracks and a reversing siding towards Kallithea station.

Services
In the past the station was the southern terminus of a peak hour train service "Tavros-Ano Patissia", later extended as "Tavros-Irini".

References

External links
 

Athens Metro stations
Railway stations opened in 1989
1989 establishments in Greece